Elizabeth Faith Ludlow is an American actress known for her portrayal of Arat in the AMC postapocalyptic horror television series The Walking Dead (2016–2018); she is also known for her role as Mona in the USA Network TV series Satisfaction, and as Cas Isakovic in Another Life (2019-2021). She also appeared in Guardians of the Galaxy Vol. 2.

Early life
Ludlow was born in Pittsburgh, Pennsylvania. She grew up in Savannah, Georgia, and was adopted as a child. Her adopted mother is from South Africa originally. She states the desire to act was inside her from an early age. Ludlow became involved with acting during her studies as Georgia State University, where she earned a degree in theatre. She chose doing this over playing soccer. Joining an acting troupe at the university opened the start of her career.

Career 
Elizabeth began her career in 2013. She portrayed a girl in an episode of The Vampire Diaries television series. Since then, she has appeared in various television series, and subsequently Resurrection, Bound, Powers, Mr. Right, and Satisfaction.

In 2017 she was in the movie Guardians of the Galaxy Vol. 2 as Easik Mother. In 2016, she portrayed Agent Kat Ryan in the film Max Steel, and also started a three season recurring role as Arat in the series The Walking Dead. In 2019, Ludlow joined the main cast of Another Life, which ran for two seasons before being canceled.

Personal life
Ludlow is a member of the LGBT community and uses she/they pronouns.

Filmography

Film

Television

References

External links

Living people
American film actresses
21st-century American women
Year of birth missing (living people)
LGBT actresses
Actresses from Pittsburgh
Actors from Georgia (U.S. state)
Actors from Savannah, Georgia
LGBT people from Georgia (U.S. state)